Propyl acetate, also known as propyl ethanoate, is an organic compound. Nearly 20,000 tons are produced annually for use as a solvent. This colorless liquid is known by its characteristic odor of pears. Due to this fact, it is commonly used in fragrances and as a flavor additive. It is formed by the esterification of acetic acid and propan-1-ol, often via Fischer–Speier esterification, with sulfuric acid as a catalyst and water produced as a byproduct.

References

External links 
NIOSH Pocket Guide to Chemical Hazards
Acetic acid, propyl ester - Toxicity Data
N-Propyl Acetate MSDS

Ester solvents
Flavors
Acetate esters
Sweet-smelling chemicals
Propyl esters